Gerd Nauhaus  (born 28 July 1942 in Erfurt) is a German musicologist.

Books 
 Robert Schumann, Tagebücher, 2 volumes, published by Gerd Nauhaus, Leipzig: Deutscher Verlag für Musik 1971–1987
 Robert Schumann, Dichtergarten für Musik. Eine Anthologie für Freunde der Literatur und Musik,

Essays 
 Dokumente zur Vorgeschichte der "Gesammelten Schriften über Musik und Musiker" von Robert Schumann, in Gutenberg-Jahrbuch, volume 64 (1989), 
 Zwischen Poesie und Musik – Schumann 2006, in Österreichische Musikzeitschrift, volume 61 (2006), Heft 10,

References

External links 
 
 

1942 births
Living people
Writers from Erfurt
20th-century German musicologists